Swerts is a Belgian surname. Notable people with the surname include:

Gill Swerts (born 1982), Belgian football player
Jan Swerts (1820–1879), Belgian painter
Roger Swerts (born 1942), Belgian cyclist

Dutch-language surnames